Ryan Neil Hendricks (born 27 January 1974) is a cricket umpire from South Africa. He was the umpire for the match played between the Western Province and North West. He is part of Cricket South Africa's umpire panel for first-class matches.

References

External links

Living people
1974 births
South African cricket umpires
People from Kimberley, Northern Cape